

England

Head coach: Geoff Cooke

 Rob Andrew
 Martin Bayfield
 Will Carling (c.)
 Wade Dooley
 Jeremy Guscott
 Simon Halliday
 Nigel Heslop
 Jason Leonard
 Brian Moore
 Dewi Morris
 David Pears
 Jeff Probyn
 Dean Richards
 Tim Rodber
 Mick Skinner
 Rory Underwood
 Jonathan Webb
 Peter Winterbottom

France

Head coach: Pierre Berbizier

 Louis Armary
 Laurent Cabannes
 Jean-Marie Cadieu
 Marc Cécillon
 Philippe Gallart
 Fabien Galthié
 Jean-Pierre Genet
 Philippe Gimbert
 Aubin Hueber
 Jean-Baptiste Lafond
 Grégoire Lascubé
 Franck Mesnel
 Vincent Moscato
 Christophe Mougeot
 Alain Penaud
 Olivier Roumat
 Jean-Luc Sadourny
 Philippe Saint-André
 Philippe Sella (c.)
 Jean-François Tordo
 Andries van Herdeen
 Sébastien Viars

Ireland

Head coach: Ciaran Fitzgerald

 Fergus Aherne
 Keith Crossan
 David Curtis
 Phil Danaher (c.)**
 Des Fitzgerald
 Mick J. Fitzgibbon
 Neil Francis
 Mick Galwey
 Simon Geoghegan
 Garret Halpin
 Paul Hogan
 Ralph Keyes
 Donal Lenihan
 Phillip Matthews (c.)*
 Derek McAleese
 Brendan Mullin
 Kenny Murphy
 Nick Popplewell
 Brian Rigney
 Brian Robinson
 Rob Saunders
 Steve Smith
 Jim Staples
 Richard Wallace
*captain in the first three games
**captain in the last game

Scotland

Head coach: Jim Telfer

 Paul Burnell
 Craig Chalmers
 Neil Edwards
 Gavin Hastings
 Scott Hastings
 Peter Jones
 Sean Lineen
 Dave McIvor
 Kenny Milne
 Iain Morrison
 Andy Nicol
 Ian Smith
 David Sole (c.)
 Tony Stanger
 Ivan Tukalo
 Rob Wainwright
 Doddie Weir
 Derek White

Wales

Head coach: Alan Davies

 R. A. Bidgood
 Tony Clement
 Tony Copsey
 Stuart Davies
 L. Delaney
 Ieuan Evans (c.)
 Scott Gibbs
 Mike Griffiths
 Michael Hall
 Garin Jenkins
 Neil Jenkins
 Robert Jones
 Emyr Lewis
 Gareth Llewellyn
 M. S. Morris
 Mike Rayer
 Colin Stephens
 Richard Webster
 Huw Williams-Jones

External links

Six Nations Championship squads
Five Nations Championship Squads